The Hampton Court Palace Festival (also promoted as the Hampton Court Palace Music Festival) is an annual musical event at Hampton Court Palace in London.

Established in 1993, the Festival is known for presenting artists across the music genres such as Sir Elton John, Kylie Minogue, Eric Clapton, Tom Jones, Andrea Bocelli, Frankie Valli, Van Morrison, Jools Holland, Liza Minnelli, James Morrison Buena Vista Social Club, Dame Kiri Te Kanawa, José Carreras and Josh Groban. The concerts are held in the "Base Court" courtyard of the palace and continue a tradition of entertainment first introduced by monarchs and nobility in the 16th and 17th century.

The event is held over 18 days in June, and is run in conjunction with Historic Royal Palaces. The venue supports an audience of 3,000, and the events culminate in a Festival Finale with a programme of classical favourites and a firework display on the East Front Gardens.

In August 2010 PWR Events Limited were awarded the contract to promote and manage the festival.

References

External links
 Official website

Music festivals in London
Hampton Court Palace
Music festivals established in 1993
1993 in London
Annual events in London
1993 establishments in England
Music in the London Borough of Richmond upon Thames